Rhodes University is a public research university located in Makhanda (Grahamstown) in the Eastern Cape Province of South Africa. It is one of four universities in the province. Established in 1904, Rhodes University is the province's oldest university, and it is the sixth oldest South African university in continuous operation, being preceded by the University of the Free State (1904), University of Witwatersrand (1896), University of South Africa (1873) as the University of the Cape of Good Hope, Stellenbosch University (1866) and the University of Cape Town (1829). Rhodes was founded in 1904 as Rhodes University College, named after Cecil Rhodes, through a grant from the Rhodes Trust. It became a constituent college of the University of South Africa in 1918 before becoming an independent university in 1951.

The university had an enrolment of over 8,000 students in the 2015 academic year, of whom just over 3,600 lived in 51 residences on campus, with the rest (known as Oppidans) taking residence in digs (off-campus residences) or in their own homes in the town.

History 

Although a proposal to found a university in Grahamstown had been made as early as 1902, financial problems caused by the Frontier Wars in Albany prevented the proposal from being implemented. In 1904 Leander Starr Jameson issued £50 000 preferred stock to the university from the Rhodes Trust. With this funding Rhodes University College was founded by an act of parliament on 31 May 1904.

University education in the Eastern Cape began in the college departments of four schools: St. Andrew's College; Gill College, Somerset East; Graaff-Reinet College; and the Grey Institute in Port Elizabeth. The four St Andrew's College professors, Arthur Matthews, George Cory, Stanley Kidd and G.F Dingemans became founding professors of Rhodes University College.

At the beginning of 1905, Rhodes moved from cramped quarters at St Andrew's to the Drostdy building, which it bought from the British Government. Rhodes became a constituent college of the new University of South Africa in 1918 and it continued to expand in size. When the future of the University of South Africa came under review in 1947, Rhodes opted to become an independent university.

Rhodes University was inaugurated on 10 March 1951. Sir Basil Schonland, son of Selmar Schonland, became the first chancellor of his alma mater, and Dr. Thomas Alty the first vice-chancellor. In terms of the Rhodes University Private Act, the University College of Fort Hare was affiliated to Rhodes University. This mutually beneficial arrangement continued until the apartheid government decided to disaffiliate Fort Hare from Rhodes. The Rhodes Senate and Council objected strongly to this, and to the Separate University Education Bill, which they condemned as interference with academic freedom. However, the two bills were passed, and Fort Hare's affiliation to Rhodes came to an end in 1959. Nevertheless, in 1962 an honorary doctorate was conferred on the state president, C.R. Swart, who (as Minister of Justice after 1948) had been responsible for the repression of opposition political organisations. The award caused the resignation of the chancellor, Sir Basil Schonland, although his reasons were not made public at the time.

James Hyslop succeeded Alty in 1963. In 1971, Rhodes negotiated to purchase the closed teacher training college run by the sisters of the Community of the Resurrection of our Lord including the buildings and grounds and a number of adjacent buildings, facilitating further expansion.

Campus 

During 2008 work began on construction of a new library building at a cost of R85 million, one of the largest infrastructure projects undertaken by the university, and was completed in 2010.

Organisation and administration

Faculties and Schools 

Rhodes has six faculties, listed below:
 Humanities (1952)
 Commerce
 Law
 Science
 Education
 Pharmacy

The six faculties are further subdivided into 30 academic departments, of which 11 form part of the humanities faculty. The humanities faculty, being the largest in the university, consists of 40% of the student intake of undergraduate and postgraduate studies, enrolling 2669 students as of 2009.

Law Clinic 

Rhodes University operates a Law Clinic, which operates as a firm of attorneys providing training to law students and free legal services for indigent people. The Law Clinic operates from two offices, one in Makhanda and one in Komani. The Law Clinic came to national attention in July 2013 when it represented 15 members of Nelson Mandela's family in their litigation against Mandla Mandela (Nelson Mandela's grandson) concerning the location of family grave sites.

Academics 

Rhodes is a small, highly residential university. For most undergraduates, first and second years of study are done while living in campus residences.

Rhodes' academic program operates on a semester calendar, beginning in early-February to early-June, and the second semester beginning in late-July and ending late-November.

Undergraduate tuition for the first year of study in 2011 towards a Bachelor of Arts and Bachelor of Science degree was R26,590 and R27,720, respectively, and the cost of board was between R35,700 and R37,600.

Student body 

Rhodes admitted 1592 students in 2012.

The tables below show the racial and gender composition of the university for that year.

SARChi Chairs 

Rhodes holds fourteen of the national research chairs appointed under the South African Research Chairs Initiative. This accounts for approximately 7% of the total awarded nationally in South Africa, a significant proportion given the university's small size.
 Critical Studies in Sexualities and Reproduction: Human and Social Dynamics (Catriona Macleod)
 Marine Ecosystems (Christopher McQuaid)
 Radio Astronomy Techniques and Technologies (Oleg Smirnov)
 Medicinal Chemistry and Nanotechnology (Tebello Nyokong)
 Mathematics Education (Marc Schafer)
 Numeracy (Mellony Graven)
 Intellectualisation of African Languages, Multilingualism and Education (Russell Kaschula)
 Insects in Sustainable Agricultural Ecosystems (Steve Compton)
 Interdisciplinary Science in Land and Natural Resource Use for Sustainable Livelihoods (Charlie Shackleton)
 Marine Natural Products Research (Rosemary Dorrington)
 Biotechnology Innovation & Engagement (Janice Limson)
 Global Change Social Learning Systems Development: Transformative Learning and Green Skills Learning (Heila Lotz-Sisitka)
 Geopolitics and the Arts of Africa (Ruth Simbao)
 Molecular and Cellular Biology of the Eukaryotic Stress Response (Adrienne Edkins)

Research bodies 
 Centre for Biological Control

Student life

Halls of Residence 
 Allan Webb Hall
 Courtenay-Latimer Hall
 Desmond Tutu
 Hugh Masekela Hall
 Drostdy Hall
 Founders Hall
 Hobson Hall
 Jan Smuts Hall
 Miriam Makeba Hall (formerly Kimberley Hall East)
 Kimberley Hall West
 Lilian Ngoyi Hall
 Nelson Mandela Hall
 St Mary Hall

Media 

There are three student newspapers, Activate, The Oppidan Press and Cue, which has been published daily during the National Arts Festival held in Makhanda every year for several decades. Activate celebrated its 65th birthday in 2012, while The Oppidan Press was only first published in 2007 with its target readership being mainly Oppidans. The journal Philosophical Papers is edited in the department of philosophy.

Ranking 

In 2011, the Webometrics Ranking of World Universities ranked the Rhodes 5th in South Africa and 700th in the world.

Notable alumni and staff 

In academia, Old Rhodian Max Theiler was awarded the Nobel Prize in Physiology or Medicine for his research in virology in 1951.

Notable alumni: general 

 Matthew Muir – Artist
 Beth Diane Armstrong – Sculptor
 Diane Awerbuck – Writer
 Norman Bailey – Opera singer
 Nick Binedell – Founding director of the Gordon Institute of Business Science of the University of Pretoria
 Troy Blacklaws – Novelist
 Alex Boraine – Politician; academic; co-founder of IDASA (Institute for Democracy in South Africa) and the International Center for Transitional Justice
 Sir Rupert Bromley, 10th Bt. – Business executive
 Guy Butler – Poet
Efemia Chela – writer
 Tafadzwa Chitokwindo – Zimbabwe Sevens rugby player
 Nan Cross – Anti-conscription and anti-apartheid activist
 Achmat Dangor – Writer
 Embeth Davidtz – Actress
 Rob Davies – Minister of trade and industry of South Africa
 Mick Davis – Businessman, chief executive of Xstrata
 Geoffrey de Jager – Philanthropist and industrialist; founder of Rand Merchant Bank
 K. Sello Duiker – Novelist and screenwriter
 Sir Michael Edwardes – Business executive
 Robin Esrock – Travel Writer
 Allan Gray – Investor and philanthropist 
 Mluleki George – ANC MP and former prisoner on Robben Island
 Igle Gledhill – Physicist
 Chris Hani – Former leader of the South African Communist Party and chief of staff of Umkhonto we Sizwe
 Errol Harris – Philosopher
 Trevor Hastie – Statistician
 Peter Hinchliff – Anglican priest and academic
 Humphry Knipe – Adult film writer/director
 Herbert Kretzmer – Fleet Street journalist and lyricist of inter alia the musical Les Misérables
 Alice Krige – Actress
 Margaret Legum – Economist and anti-apartheid activist
 Frances Margaret Leighton – Botanist
 Kai Lossgott – Interdisciplinary artist
 Mbuyiseli Madlanga – South African Constitutional Court judge
 Mandla Mandela – Chief of the Mvezo Traditional Council and grandson of Nelson Mandela
 The Hon Justice Lex Mpati – Judge President of the Supreme Court of Appeal of South Africa and current chancellor of Rhodes University
 Patrick Mynhardt – Actor
 Marguerite Poland – Writer
 Ian Roberts – Actor
 Michael Roberts – Historian
 Kathleen Satchwell – Judge
 Sir Basil Schonland – Scientist
 Barry Smith – Musician
 Ian Smith – Former Prime Minister of Rhodesia (now Zimbabwe)
 Wilbur Smith – Novelist
 William Smith – Television science and mathematics personality
 Kaneez Surka – Artist, actor and comedian
 Robert V. Taylor – Former dean of St. Mark's Episcopal Cathedral, Seattle
 Phumzile van Damme – MP and Shadow Communications Minister
 Max Theiler – Virologist, Nobel prize winner (1951)
 Micheen Thornycroft – Zimbabwe Olympic rower
 Kit Vaughan – Emeritus professor of biomedical engineering at UCT
 David Webster – Social anthropologist and anti-apartheid activist
 Mark Winkler – Author
 Timothy Woods – Former head of Gresham's School, England
 Dana Wynter – Actress
 Simphiwe Tshabalala – Standard Bank CEO

Notable alumni: journalists, media celebrities in South Africa 

One of the most well-known departments on the Rhodes campus is the university's school of Journalism and Media Studies, through which many of South Africa's most notable media celebrities have passed. There are also an especially high number of radio celebrities who graduated at Rhodes – many of them having spent time with the university's campus radio station Rhodes Music Radio.
 Matthew Buckland – Media-owner and entrepreneur
Steve Linde (born 1960) – newspaperman 
 Anand Naidoo – Anchor and correspondent for Al Jazeera English based in Washington DC; previously with CNN
 Jeremy Mansfield – Radio host, television presenter, comedian
 Eusebius McKaiser – Social activist, author, radio show host
 Haru Mutasa – Correspondent for Al Jazeera International
 Zaa Nkweta – Former Carte Blanche presenter
 Verashni Pillay – Mail & Guardian editor-in-chief
 Toby Shapshak – Journalist and African technology thought leader
 Barry Streek – Political journalist and anti-apartheid activist
 Rob Vember – 5FM DJ

Notable staff 
 Prof Thomas Alty FRSE – physicist; Principal and Vice Chancellor of the university
 Margaret Ballinger – Political activist; taught in the history department
 André Brink – Writer
 Andrew Buckland – Performer and playwright
 Julian Cobbing – Professor of African history; wrote an influential and controversial theory on the nature of the Mfecane
 Ward Jones – Professor of philosophy
 Don Maclennan – Professor of English and notable poet
 Catriona Ida Macleod, head of the psychology department
 Obie Oberholzer – Photographer
 D. C. S. Oosthuizen – Philosopher, Christian, critic of apartheid
 Selmar Schonland – Botanist
 J.L.B. Smith – Ichthyologist; first to identify a taxidermied fish as a coelacanth, a fish previously thought to be extinct
 H.W. van der Merwe – Founder of the Centre for Intergroup Studies, University of Cape Town
 Etienne van Heerden – Writer
 Arthur Matthews (mathematician), founding professor at the university
 Graham Glover - Author, Associate professor, editor of the South African Law Journal

Name controversy
The university's name references Cecil Rhodes, a British businessman who heavily aided British imperial interests in South Africa, which led to controversy starting in 2015. Protests held that year by Rhodes Must Fall led to the University of Cape Town removing a statue of Rhodes, and similar protests against Rhodes' legacy occurred at Rhodes University. Some students and outlets started referring to it as "The University Currently Known As Rhodes". In 2015 the university council undertook to determine whether or not the institution should change its name, as well as consider several other ways it could deal with the issues.

In 2017, the Rhodes University Council voted 15–9 in favour of keeping the existing name. While the university agreed with critics that "[it] cannot be disputed that Cecil John Rhodes was an arch-imperialist and white supremacist who treated people of this region as sub-human", it also said it had long since distanced itself from the person and had distinguished itself with the name Rhodes University as one of the world's best. The main argument against the change was financial, as such a change would cost a significant amount of money and the university was already having trouble with its budget. Furthermore, changing the university's name could have an adverse effect on its recognition internationally.

See also 
 List of universities in South Africa
 1820 Settlers National Monument
 National Arts Festival

References

Further reading

External links 

 

 
Universities in the Eastern Cape
Educational institutions established in 1904
Public universities in South Africa
Buildings and structures in Makhanda, Eastern Cape
Herbert Baker buildings and structures
1904 establishments in the Cape Colony
Naming controversies